Ulrich, is a German given name, derived from Old High German Uodalrich, Odalric. It is composed of the elements uodal- meaning "heritage" and -rich meaning "rich, powerful". Attested from the 8th century as the name of Alamannic nobility, the name is popularly given from the high medieval period in reference to Saint Ulrich of Augsburg (canonized 993).

There is also a surname Ulrich. It is most prevalent in Germany and has the highest density in Switzerland.  This last name was found in the United States around the year 1840.  Most Americans with the last name were concentrated in Pennsylvania, which was home to many German immigrant communities. Nowadays in the United States, the name is distributed largely in the Pennsylvania-Ohio region .

History
Documents record the Old High German name Oadalrich or Uodalrich from the later 8th century  in Alamannia.
The related name Adalric  (Anglo-Saxon cognate Æthelric) is attested from the 6th century (Athalaric King of the Ostrogoths;  Æthelric of Bernicia).
The name of Agilolfing duke Odilo (fl. 709–748) may represent a short form of the name.

Count Udalrich I (fl. 778–814), a son of Gerold of Vinzgau, founded the Alamannic Udalriching dynasty, ancestral to the counts of Bregenz.
The given name occurred frequently in the Alamannic Hunfriding dynasty in the 9th to 10th centuries; examples include Odalric, Count of Barcelona (fl. 850s) and Odalric, Count of Thurgau (fl. 920s). 
The name is recorded in an Icelandic form as Óðalríkr only in the later medieval period.

In the Middle High German period the name generally commemorated Saint Ulrich, Bishop of Augsburg (c. 890 – 4 July 973), who twice defended Augsburg from attacks by Magyars.

The Swiss Reformer Ulrich Zwingli etymologized his given name as Huldrych (Huldricus, Huldaricus), i.e. "rich in grace".
In the wake of Zwingli, during the 16th century and well into the 18th century, it became a fashion -
especially for Protestant writers - to Latinise the given name Ulrich as Huldricus.<ref>e.g. Huldricus Mutius (Ulrich Hugwald), Huldricus Huttenus (Ulrich von Hutten), 'Hulrdicus Euchaustius, so in a  1776 edition of the acts of the Council of Trent.</ref>

The name was popularly given in 20th-century Switzerland, especially from the 1940s to the 1960s, 
peaking at rank 16 in 1947, but dropping below rank 100 in 1972.
In Czechoslovakia, Oldřich  was popularly given in the 1940s to 1950s, peaking at rank 18 during 1946–1951.

Variants
The German given name was adopted in Czech and Slovak as Oldřich, Oldrich and in Scandinavian as Ulrik, in Slovenian as Urh, in Latvia as Uldis.

Common German hypocoristics are Uli or Ulli (Swiss Ueli) and historically Utz. A Czech/Slovak hypocoristic is Volek and a Polish one Ryczek.

Feminine forms Ulrikke and Ulrika have been recorded from the early modern period.

People with the given name
Medieval to early modern
 Udalrich I, count in Alamannia (fl. 778–814), son of Gerold of Vinzgau
 Udalrich II, son of Udalrich I, count in Alamannia (fl. 800/803)
 Odalric, Count of Barcelona (fl. 850s)
 Ulrich of Augsburg (ca. 890 – 973), bishop and saint
 Oldřich, Duke of Bohemia (c.  975 – 1034)
 Ulric Manfred II of Turin (b. 1034),   Count of Turin and Margrave of Susa
 Ulric I of Carniola (d. 1070), the Margrave of Carniola and Carinthia 
 Ulric II of Carniola (d. 1112), the Margrave of Istria 
 Ulrich I, Bishop of Passau (c. 1027 – 1121)
 Ulrich of Zell (1029–93), abbot and saint
 Ulrich I Bishop of Eichstätt (r. 1075–1099)
 Ulrich of Bamberg (fl. 1100), priest and chronicler
 Ulrich II von Bogen, Bishop of Eichstätt (r. 1112–1125)
 Oldřich of Olomouc (d. 1177), duke in Bohemia
 Ulrich von Zatzikhoven, late 12th century author of the Arthurian romance Lanzelet Ulrich II (bishop of Passau) (d. 1221)
 Ulrich von Liechtenstein (1200–1275), medieval writer, poet and knight
 Ulrich III, Duke of Carinthia (ca. 1220 – 1269)
 Ulrich II, Count of Württemberg (ca. 1254 – 1279)
 Ulrich III, Count of Württemberg (after 1286 – 1392)
 Ulrich II von Graben (before 1300 – ca. 1361), Austrian nobleman
 Ulrich III, Lord of Hanau (c. 1310 – 1369 or 1370)
 Ulrich IV, Count of Württemberg (after 1315 – 1366)
 Ulrich von Jungingen (1360–1410), 26th Grand Master of the Teutonic Knights
 Ulrich II, Count of Celje (1406–1456)
 Ulrich I, Count of East Frisia (1408–1466)
 Ulrich III von Nussdorf, Bishop of Passau (r. 1451–1479)
 Ulrich V, Count of Württemberg (1413–1480)
 Ulrich II, Duke of Mecklenburg-Stargard (probably before 1428 – 1471)
 Ulrich Fugger the Elder (1441–1510), German businessman and member of the Fugger family
 Ulrich Rülein von Calw (1465–1523), mayor of Freiberg, Saxony
 Ulrich of Hardegg (after 1483–1535), Count of Hardegg
 Ulrich Zwingli (1484–1535), leader of the Reformation in Switzerland
 Ulrich, Duke of Württemberg (1487–1550)
 Ulrich von Hutten (1488–1523), German knight, scholar, poet and reformer during Knights' Revolt 
 Ulrich Hugwald (1496–1571), Swiss reformer
 Ulrich, Duke of Mecklenburg (1527–1603)
 Ulrik of Denmark (1578–1624), administrator of the Prince-Bishopric of Schwerin
 Ulrich, Duke of Pomerania (1589–1622)
 Ulrik of Denmark (1611–1633), administrator of the Prince-Bishopric of Schwerin
 Ulrich Grappler von Trappenburg, Bishop of Passau (r. 1646–1658)

Modern era

 Ulrich, 10th Prince Kinsky of Wchinitz and Tettau (1893–1938), titular pretender
 Ulrich Daldrup (born 1947), German scientist and mayor of Aachen
 Ulrich Eberl (born 1962), German science and technology journalist
 Ulrich Ellis (1904–1981), Australian writer
 Ulrich Graf (1878–1950), member of Hitler's inner circle
 Ulric Guttinguer (1785–1866), French novelist
 Ulrich Herbert (born 1951), German historian
 Hans-Ulrich Indermaur (born 1939), Swiss journalist and writer
 Ulrich Leyendecker (born 1946), German composer of contemporary classical music
 Ulrich Marida, Central African Republic basketball coach
 Ulrich Matthes (born 1959), German actor
 Ueli Maurer (b. 1950), Swiss politician
 Ulrich Mühe (1953–2007), German actor and director
 Ulrich Noethen (born 1959), German actor
 Ulrich Salchow (1877–1949), German figure skater and inventor of the salchow jump
 Ulrich Schmid-Maybach, philanthropist, real estate developer and entrepreneur
 Ulrich Schnauss (born 1977), German musician
 Ulrich Wilhelm Graf Schwerin von Schwanenfeld (1902–1944), a key conspirator in the failed 20 July plot to assassinate Hitler in 1944
 Ulrich Steinhilper (1918–2009), World War II Luftwaffe ace credited by some with the concept of word processing
 Ulrich von Wilamowitz-Moellendorff (1848–1931), German classical philologist
 Ulrich Wild (born 1969), American record producer
 Ulrich Friedrich Wilhelm Joachim von Ribbentrop (1893-1946), more commonly known as Joachim von Ribbentrop, Foreign Minister of Nazi Germany from 1938 until 1945
 Ulrich Frédéric Woldemar, Comte de Lowendal (1700–1755), German-born French soldier and statesmen

 People with the surname 
 Benjamin Ulrich (born 1988), German rugby union international
 Bror Ludvig Ulrich (1818–1887), Swedish military and colonial governor
 Christian Ulrich (1836–1909), Austrian architect
 D. K. Ulrich (born 1944), American race car driver/owner
 Donald Ulrich aka Don Rich (1941–1974) American country music musician
 Dutch Ulrich (1899–1929), American baseball player
 Edward Oscar Ulrich (1857–1944), American invertebrate paleontologist
 Einer Ulrich (1896-1969), Danish tennis player
 Eric Ulrich (born 1985), American politician from New York City
 Fernando Ulrich (born 1952), Portuguese economist and banking administrator
 Henry G. Ulrich III, United States Navy admiral who retired in 2007
 Jan Ullrich (born 1973), German race cyclist
 Jennifer Ulrich (born 1984), German actress
 Joe Ulrich (born 1961), American former soccer player
 Lars Ulrich (born 1963), Danish drummer for heavy metal band Metallica
 Laurent Ulrich (born 1951), French archbishop of the Catholic Church 
 Laurel Thatcher Ulrich (born 1938), American historian and writer
 Lester J. Ulrich (1908-1991), American lawyer and politician
 Richard Ulrich (born 1942), German board game designer
 Skeet Ulrich (born 1970), American actor
 Torben Ulrich (born 1928), Danish writer and tennis pro
 Tracy Ulrich (born 1966), aka Tracii Guns, guitarist and musician
 Werner Ulrich (born 1948), Swiss social scientist and practical philosopher
 William M. Ulrich (born ca. 1956), American management consultant

 Fictional characters 
 Ulrich, the old sorcerer in the film Dragonslayer (1981)
 Ulrich, the protagonist of Robert Musil's 20th century novel The Man Without Qualities Ulrich Stern, a character on the French animated TV series Code Lyoko Ulrich von Bek, the hero of The War Hound and the World's Pain and other novels by Michael Moorcock
 Ulrich von Gradwitz, a character in Saki's short story "The Interlopers"
 Ulrich von Liechtenstein, an alias of Heath Ledger's character in the film A Knight's Tale Walter von Ulrich, one of the main characters in the novels Fall of Giants and Winter of the World by Welsh author Ken Follett
 Ulrich Wolfshead, warlord of the Nadir in David Gemmells Drenai tales.
 Maj. Ulrich Herzoff, alias used by Rex Harrison's character in Carol Reed's film Night Train to Munich Ullrich, an enemy appearing in Nintendo's EarthBound Beginnings.
 Ulrich Nielsen, a character in the German Netflix original series Dark''.

See also
 Huldreich (disambiguation)
 St. Ulrich's and St. Afra's Abbey, Augsburg
 St. Ulrich's Priory in the Black Forest
 Uli (disambiguation)
 Ulric (disambiguation)
 Ulrich's Periodicals Directory
 Uldis

References

External links
  Profile of surname; note: contains errors.
 Uodalrich (nordicnames.de)

German masculine given names
Germanic given names
Surnames from given names